The 2011 FIA GT1 Algarve round is an auto racing event held at the Autódromo Internacional do Algarve in Portimão, Portugal on 6–8 May 2011.  The event is the third round of the 2011 FIA GT1 World Championship season.  FIA GT1 previously visited the Algarve circuit in autumn 2010, with drivers Peter Dumbreck and Michael Krumm of Sumo Power Nissan winning the Qualifying Race, and Michael Bartels and Andrea Bertolini of Vitaphone Maserati winning the Championship Race.  The event is supported by the FIA GT3 European Championship, the Mini Challenge, and local Portuguese racing series.

The race weekend was swept by Nissan, whose teams won pole position and both races.  JR Motorsports' Richard Westbrook and Peter Dumbreck won pole on qualifying, while the rest of Nissan locked out the front two rows of the grid.  In the Qualifying Race Westbrook and Dumbreck won by less than a second over teammates Michael Krumm and Lucas Luhr, and Sumo Power's David Brabham and Jamie Campbell-Walter earned Nissan a podium sweep.  In the Championship Race, Westbrook and Dumbreck's car suffered gearbox failure, allowing Krumm and Luhr to take the race victory, ahead of Darren Turner and Stefan Mücke for Young Driver Aston Martin, and Brabham and Campbell-Walter once again finishing third.

Background

Following the sweep of both races in the second round at Zolder, Markus Winkelhock and Marc Basseng come to the Algarve as the Drivers' Championship leaders, thirteen points clear of Abu Dhabi winners Clivio Piccione and Stef Dusseldorp, and a further six points ahead of the other Hexis AMR drivers Christian Hohenadel and Andrea Piccini. In the Teams' Championship, Münnich Lamborghini has a 19-point lead over Hexis Aston Martin. The second Aston Martin squad of Young Driver AMR is three points behind Hexis.

Following scheduling conflicts for several drivers involved other racing series, three teams have made changes to their line-ups for this round.  DKR Engineering has replaced Jaime Camara with experienced GT1 driver Matteo Bobbi, who drove for both Hegersport and Marc VDS in 2010, while Frédéric Makowiecki is replaced by former Hexis driver Yann Clairay at Marc VDS.  Belgian Racing has made changes to the line-ups of both of their cars; Christoffer Nygaard joins the team after campaigning for Young Driver in 2010 to partner Vanina Ickx in the Mo. 9 Ford, while Antoine Leclerc, who drove for the team in Abu Dhabi earlier this season, moves to the No. 10 car to partner Martin Matzke.

Qualifying

Qualifying result
For qualifying, Driver 1 participates in the first and third sessions while Driver 2 participates in only the second session.  The fastest lap for each session is indicated with bold.

 The No. 8 Young Driver Aston Martin's Session 3 times were cancelled after Stefan Mücke returned to the team's pit stall at the end of the session instead of entering parc fermé.  Their qualifying position was demoted to eighth.
 The No. 8 Young Driver Aston Martin received a five grid place penalty for changing an engine during the event.

Races

Qualifying Race
The quartet of Nissans which had locked out the front two rows led away from the rolling start, with pole sitter Peter Dumbreck entering the first corner in the lead.  The No. 5 Swiss Lamborghini of Peter Kox was able to get amongst the Nissans, but made contact with the No. 20 Sumo Power Nissan of Ricardo Zonta, spinning Zonta to a stop on the inside of the corner.  Entering the fourth turn, Kox's Lamborghini was then spun by Alex Müller's Young Driver Aston Martin and collecting the Hexis Aston Martin of Clivio Piccione.  Müller's car suffered suspension failure and retired after being vaulted into the air by the Lamborghini, while the rest of the field following behind was forced to use runoff and gravel areas on the outside of the turn to avoid the three spun cars.  Following the first lap melee, Dumbreck held his lead over teammate Michael Krumm, and Sumo Power's David Brabham maintained third.  Stefan Mücke used the incidents to his advantage to move from thirteenth to sixth, while Dominik Schwager was elevated to seventh position after starting last.

At the opening of the pit window Dumbreck's lead was nearly a second over Krumm, while Mücke, Schwager, and Yann Clairay had all managed to pass the Exim Bank Corvette of Nick Catsburg to take fourth, fifth, and sixth places respectively.  After the leading pair made their individual stops on consecutive laps, Lucas Luhr was able to take over the race lead from his teammate Richard Westbrook, but two laps later Westbrook passed Luhr down the inside into Turn 1.  Westbrook and Luhr maintained their positions within a second of each other to the end of the race, while Jamie Campbell-Walter secured a Nissan sweep of the podium by holding third place fifteen seconds behind the leaders.

Race result

Championship Race

Race result

References

External links
 Circuito Algarve GT1 Race in Portugal – FIA GT1 World Championship

Algarve
FIA GT1